Abanycha bicolor is a species of beetle in the family Cerambycidae. It was described by Gahan in 1889. It is known from Ecuador.

References

Hemilophini
Beetles described in 1889